Hemant Choudhary  is an Indian actor who appears in Hindi serials, films and web series.

Early life and career 
Hemant Choudhary was born in Godda, a small town in Jharkhand and brought up in Hazaribagh, Jharkhand. He completed his later education in Delhi. He moved to Mumbai in the 90s to pursue a career as an actor in the Entertainment Industry.

In the late 90s he acted in movies such as Border and  Return of Jewel Thief.

He is best known for his role of Raghunath Singh in Zee TV 's Jhansi Ki Rani.
He made his debut on television in 2001 with Zee TV 's Gharana in which he played the character of Rahul Somani.
He has also starred in shows such as Siya Ke Ram,  Veer Shivaji, Thapki Pyar Ki, Main Maike Chali Jaungi Tum Dekhte Rahiyo, Namah Lakshmi Narayan, Saath Saath Banayenge Ek Aashiyaan, Kumkum and Ek Ghar Banaunga. He has appeared in films and web series such as Border, Azhar, Once Upon a Time in Mumbaai and Aashram - Season 3.

Filmography

Film

Television

Web series

Music Video

References

External links
 

Year of birth missing (living people)
Living people
Indian male television actors